A surveillance aircraft is an aircraft used for surveillance. They are operated by military forces and other government agencies in roles such as intelligence gathering, battlefield surveillance, airspace surveillance, reconnaissance, observation (e.g. artillery spotting), border patrol and fishery protection. This article concentrates on aircraft used in those roles, rather than for traffic monitoring, law enforcement and similar activities.

Surveillance aircraft usually carry no armament, or only limited defensive armament. They do not always require high-performance capability or stealth characteristics, and may be modified civilian aircraft. Surveillance aircraft have also included moored balloons (e.g. TARS) and unmanned aerial vehicles (UAVs).

Definitions

The terms “surveillance” and “reconnaissance” have sometimes been used interchangeably, but, in the military context, a distinction can be drawn between surveillance, which monitors a changing situation in real time, and reconnaissance, which captures a static picture for analysis.

Surveillance is sometimes grouped with Intelligence, Target acquisition and Reconnaissance under the title ISTAR.

Observation was the term used for surveillance when the main sensor was the human eye.

History

Pre World War I

In 1794, during the Battle of Fleurus, the French Aerostatic Corps balloon L'Entreprenant remained afloat for nine hours.  French officers used the balloon to observe the movements of the Austrian Army, dropping notes to the ground for collection by the French Army, and also signalled messages using semaphore.

World War I
One of the first aircraft used for surveillance was the Rumpler Taube during World War I, when aviators like Fred Zinn evolved entirely new methods of reconnaissance and photography.  The translucent wings of the plane made it very difficult for ground-based observers to detect a Taube at an altitude above 400 m.  The French also called this plane "the Invisible Aircraft", and it is sometimes also referred to as the "world's very first stealth plane".  German Taube aircraft were able to detect the advancing Russian army during the Battle of Tannenberg (1914).

World War II
During World War II, light aircraft such as the Auster were used as air observation posts.  Officers from the British Royal Artillery were trained as pilots to fly AOP aircraft for artillery spotting.
The air observation role was generally taken over by light observation helicopters, such as the Hughes OH-6 Cayuse, from the mid-1960s.

Pre war, the British identified a need for an aircraft that could follow and observe the enemy fleet at a distance. To this end the slow-flying Airspeed Fleet Shadower and General Aircraft Fleet Shadower designs were built and flown in 1940 but they were made obsolete by the introduction of airborne radar.

Cold War
Spy flights were a source of major contention between the US and Soviet Union during most of the 1960s.

Roles

Maritime patrol

Maritime patrol aircraft are typically large, slow machines capable of flying continuously for many hours, with a wide range of sensors. Such aircraft include the Hawker-Siddeley Nimrod, the Breguet Atlantique, the Tupolev Tu-95, the Lockheed P-2 Neptune and the Lockheed P-3 Orion/CP-140 Aurora. Smaller ship-launched observation seaplanes were used from World War I through World War II.

Law enforcement

Predator UAVs have been used by the US for border patrol.

Battlefield and airspace surveillance

Current use

Unmanned Aerial Vehicle (UAV) surveillance aircraft have been "deployed or are under development in many countries, including Israel, the UK, the United States, Canada, China, India, South Africa and Pakistan." Drones are increasingly used in conservation work to complete tasks such as mapping forest cover, tracking wildlife, and enforcing environmental laws by catching illegal loggers or poachers.

Unmanned surveillance UAVs include both airships—such as Sky Sentinel 
and HiSentinel 80—and airplanes.

Most air forces around the world lack dedicated surveillance planes.

Several countries adapt aircraft for electronic intelligence (ELINT) gathering. The Beech RC-12 Super King Air and Boeing RC-135 Rivet Joint are examples of this activity.

Business aircraft
With smaller equipment, long-range business aircraft can be modified in surveillance aircraft to perform specialized missions cost-effectively, from ground surveillance to maritime patrol:
 The , 6,750 nmi Gulfstream G550 was selected for the IAI EL/W-2085 Conformal Airborne Early Warning AESA radar for Italy, Singapore and Israel (which also has IAI Sigint G550s) while L3 Technologies transfers the U.S. Compass Call electronic-attack system to the G550 CAEW-based EC-37B, like the NC-37B range-support aircraft, and will modify others for Australia's  program, Northrop Grumman proposes the G550 for the J-Stars Recap;
 Dassault Aviation developed the Falcon 900 MPA and Falcon 2000 Maritime Multirole Aircraft for France (which delayed its Avsimar requirement), South Korea and the Japan Coast Guard with a mission system developed with L3 and Thales Group;
 Embraer delivered several EMB-145s as a platform for AEW&C, MPA and multi-intelligence;
 the Beechcraft King Air 350ER is a platform for ISR versions, including L3's Spyder II and Sierra Nevada Corp.’s Scorpion and as the MC-12W for the U.S. Army.

See also
 HALE aircraft
 MikroKopter
 Reconnaissance aircraft
 Treaty on Open Skies
 Micro air vehicle

References

External links
 US Centennial of Flight Commission: "Military Use of Balloons During the Napoleonic Era". Retrieved April 1, 2007.
 Maps of FBI and DHS surveillance flights over the United States in 2015

Military aircraft
Signals intelligence
Surveillance